The 1983–84 FA Cup was the 103rd season of the world's oldest football knockout competition, The Football Association Challenge Cup, or FA Cup.  The competition was won by Everton, who defeated first-time finalists Watford 2–0 at Wembley.

First round proper

Teams from the Football League Third and Fourth Division entered in this round plus Telford United, Northwich Victoria, Enfield and Altrincham were given byes. The first round matches were played over the weekend of 19–20 November 1983. Replays were played on 21–23 November, or 28 November.

Second round proper

The second round matches were played mainly on 10 December 1983, with a couple of ties and replays being played on 13–14 December, or 19 December.

Third round proper

Teams from the Football League First and Second Division entered in this round. The third round matches were played over the weekend 6–8 January 1984. Replays took place on 10–11 January, with second replays on 16 January. Holders Manchester United were eliminated by third-tier Bournemouth.

Fourth round proper

The fourth round matches were mainly played over the weekend of 28–29 January 1984. Some games were instead played or replayed on 30 January–1 February.

Fifth round proper

The fifth round matches were all played on 17–18 February 1984, with no replays required.

Sixth round proper

The sixth round matches were played on the weekend of 10–11 March 1984 with replays on 14 and 20 March.

Semi-finals

Referee:- George Courtney (Spennymoor)

Referee:- Joe Worrall (Warrington)

Final

TV Coverage
The right to show FA Cup games were, as with Football League matches, shared between the BBC and ITV network.  For the first time, four games were allowed to be screened Live from the Third round to the sixth and shared between the two companies, as well as the Final. An attempt by the broadcasters to show the Semi-Finals live on consecutive Sunday afternoons was rejected by the FA in November 1983. Other games were shown in a highlights format. ITV coverage was now nationalized for the first time, although a strike prevented ITV coverage of the Third round. No highlights or live games were screened from Rounds One and Two.
Third Round BBC Liverpool v Newcastle United (LIVE-Friday Evening), Fulham v Tottenham Hotspur, Norwich City v Aston Villa (Midweek replay), Tottenham Hotspur v Fulham (Midweek replay) ITV No games broadcast due to strike. Fourth Round BBC Shrewsbury Town v Ipswich Town, Tottenham Hotspur v Norwich City, Portsmouth v Southampton ITV Brighton & Hove Albion v Liverpool (LIVE-Sunday Afternoon), Norwich City v Tottenham Hotspur (Midweek replay) Fifth Round BBC Blackburn Rovers v Southampton (LIVE-Friday Evening) ITV Watford v Brighton & Hove Albion, Derby County v Norwich City, Oxford United v Sheffield Wednesday Sixth Round BBC Birmingham City v Watford, Plymouth Argyle v Derby County, Notts County v Everton, Derby County v Plymouth Argyle (Midweek replay) ITV Sheffield Wednesday v Southampton (LIVE-Sunday Afternoon) Semi-Finals BBC Plymouth Argyle v Watford ITV Everton v Southampton Final Everton v Watford, shown Live by both the BBC & ITV.

References
 FA Cup Results Archive
 
 
 
 1983–84 Rothmans Football Yearbook

 
FA Cup seasons
1983–84 domestic association football cups
FA